The Supply of Goods and Services Act 1982 (c 29) is an Act of the Parliament of the United Kingdom that requires traders to provide services to a proper standard of workmanship ("with reasonable care and skill"). Furthermore, if a definite completion date or a price has not been fixed then the work must be completed within a reasonable time and for a reasonable charge. The Act was partially superseded by the Consumer Rights Act 2015, insofar as that Act applies, i.e. between trader and consumers, for contracts entered into from 1 October 2015. The Supply of Goods and Services Act 1982 as amended remains in force in England, Wales, Northern Ireland; only Part IA of the Act, which creates provisions analogous to Part I of the Act, and Part III, which deals with the Act's commencement etc., apply in Scotland.

Overview
Parts 1 and 1A (Scotland) relate to goods. The Act applies to "relevant contracts for the transfer of goods", being those where one person agrees to transfer property in goods, i.e. ownership of the goods, to another person; the Act also applies to contracts for the hire of goods (sections 6 to 10A).

The Act does not, however, apply to any "excepted contract", which includes sales of goods (covered by the Sale of Goods Act 1979, for trader to trader contracts, and the Consumer Rights Act 2015, for trader to consumer contracts) and Hire Purchase Agreements.

When applicable, the Act implies terms into "relevant contracts for the transfer of goods" and "relevant contracts for the hire of goods".

In summary, into "relevant contracts for the transfer of goods" the Act implies the following terms:

Title
Section 2 prescribes an implied term regarding title (i.e. a legal right to transfer the property) and various implied warranties.

 The transferor must have the right to transfer the property in the goods, i.e. ownership unencumbered by any security, at the relevant time under the contract when transfer must be made.
 This applies unless the contract or the circumstances imply only the rights the transferor possess at the relevant time are due to be transferred; however it is also implied that the difference between unencumbered ownership and what is actually being transferred has been disclosed to the receiver.

Description
If the transferor has agreed to transfer the property in the goods by description, it is implied that the goods will match the description.

Reasonableness
If the seller knows from the buyer the particular purpose for which the goods are being acquired, sections 4(4) and 4(5) create an implied term that "the goods supplied under the contract are reasonably fit for that purpose".

The Act also states that a reasonable time (section 14(2)) and a reasonable charge (section 15(2)) are "questions of fact", but it does not explain how the "fact of reasonableness" is to be determined. However, the Unfair Contract Terms Act 1977 and its concomitant case law provided a number of guidelines.

Case law
Trebor Bassett Holdings Ltd v ADT Fire and Security, 2012, involved a contract for ADT to "the design, supply, install and commission a fire detection and suppression system for a popcorn factory" in Pontefract owned and operated by Trebor Bassett and Cadbury. There was a fire in June 2005 which the installed system failed to extinguish. The Court held that ADT were asked to design a system to meet Bassett's specific fire safety requirements and therefore they were providing a service, for which there was a requirement to take reasonable care, but the design and supply of such a system did not constitute a "supply of goods" for the purpose of Part 1 of the Act. The section 4 requirement that "the goods supplied under the contract are reasonably fit for that purpose" was therefore not invoked by this contract.

References

External links
Text of the UK Supply of Goods and Services Act 1982 (as amended)

United Kingdom Acts of Parliament 1982